The national emblem of the Yakut Autonomous Soviet Socialist Republic was adopted in 1937 by the government of the Yakut Autonomous Soviet Socialist Republic. The emblem is identical to the emblem of the Russian Soviet Federative Socialist Republic.

History

First version 
The first emblem of the Yakut ASSR was described in the Constitution of the Yakut ASSR, which was approved by the Fourth All-Yakut Congress of Soviets on September 25, 1926. Article 118 of the constitution contained description of the emblem of the Yakut ASSR:

Second version 
On March 9, 1937, the extraordinary 9th All-Yakut Congress of Soviets approved a new Constitution of the Yakut ASSR. Article 108 of the Constitution describes the emblem of the Yakut ASSR:

The new emblem of the Yakut ASSR was reconfirmed by the approval through the Decree of the Presidium of the Central Executive Committee of the Yakut ASSR on May 13, 1938.

First revision 
In 1939, the Yakut language shifted its writing method from Latin alphabet to Cyrillic alphabet. Hence, the inscription on the emblem changed.

Second revision 
On May 31, 1978, the 8th extraordinary session of the Supreme Council of the Yakut ASSR adopted a new Constitution of the Yakut ASSR. Article 157 of the constitution describes the Emblem of the Yakut ASSR:

A red star with a gold border was added to the top of the emblem.

This design was reconfirmed with the Decree of the Supreme Soviet of the Yakut ASSR on July 27, 1978.

Gallery

References 

Yakut Autonomous Soviet Socialist Republic
Yakut ASSR
Yakut ASSR
Yakut ASSR
Yakut ASSR
Yakut ASSR